The Leaning Tower of Suurhusen is a late medieval steeple in Suurhusen, a village in the East Frisian region of northwestern Germany. According to the Guinness World Records it was at one time the most tilted tower in the world, although intentionally inclined towers such as the Montreal Tower far surpass it. The Suurhusen steeple  claimed to be the unintentionally tilted tower with the greatest angle of lean in the world, 1.22° more than Leaning Tower of Pisa.

History
The Brick Gothic church in Suurhusen is reminiscent of the old fortress churches. In 1450 the church was shortened by about a quarter and the tower was built in the space. This tower currently leans at an angle of 5.19° (5° 11′), compared with 3.97° (3° 58′) for the Pisa tower after its stabilization.

According to local historian Tjabbo van Lessen, the church was built in the Middle Ages in marshy land on foundations of oak tree trunks which were preserved by groundwater. When the land was drained in the 19th century, the wood rotted, causing the tower to tilt. The steeple was closed to the public in 1975 for safety reasons, and re-opened 10 years later after it was stabilized. (However, The Leaning Tower of Gau-Weinheim was leaning at 5.4277° on 15 July 2022.)

Data
 Area: , 
 Height: 
 Overhang: 
 Foundation:  masonry, resting on oak piles
 Total weight:

Gallery

See also
List of leaning towers
Oberkirche of Bad Frankenhausen

References

External links

Homepage of the church

Brick buildings and structures
Buildings and structures in Aurich (district)
Suurhusen
Suurhusen
Suurhusen
Buildings and structures completed in 1450
Towers completed in the 15th century